Wilton railway station or Wilton station may refer to
 Wilton station (Metro-North), in Wilton, Connecticut, United States
 Wilton station (North Dakota), in Wilton, North Dakota, United States
 Wilton North railway station, on the Salisbury branch line of the Great Western Railway
 Wilton South railway station, on the London and South Western Railway West of England Line
 South Wilton station, in Wilton, Connecticut, United States

See also
 Williton railway station on the West Somerset Railway
 Witton railway station in Birmingham